Orthoruza is a monotypic moth genus of the family Noctuidae. Its only species, Orthoruza niveipuncta, is found in New Guinea. Both the genus and species were first described by Warren in 1913.

References

Acontiinae
Monotypic moth genera